Paul W. Miller (August 10, 1899 – August 6, 1976) was a Democratic member of the Pennsylvania House of Representatives.

References

Democratic Party members of the Pennsylvania House of Representatives
1899 births
1976 deaths
20th-century American politicians